Soleil may be either a surname or given name.

Given name 
 Soleil Moon Frye (b. 1976), an American actress and director.

Surname 
 Sky Soleil (b. 1977), an American actor and director.
 Jean-Baptiste Soleil (1798-1878), French optician and engineer.